Chilochroma is a genus of moths of the family Crambidae.

Species
Chilochroma albicostalis (Hampson, 1913)
Chilochroma interlinealis (Dyar, 1917)
Chilochroma tucumana Munroe, 1964
Chilochroma yucatana Munroe, 1964

References

Pyraustinae
Crambidae genera
Taxa named by Hans Georg Amsel